Hassianycteris is an extinct genus of Early Eocene (Ypresian) bats from the Hassianycterididae with two or three known species: the type (H. messelensis), found in the Messel pit, Germany, H. kumasi, found in the Cambay Shale Formation (Vastan Lignite Mine), India, and the possible third species "H." joeli, found in the Kortijk Clay Formation, Belgium. Alongside Palaeochiropteryx tupaiodon (alive roughly 48 million years ago), P. tupaiodon and Hassianycteris kumari are the first fossil mammals whose colouration has been discovered: both were reddish-brown when alive. H. messelensis was probably a similar colour when alive.

References 

Prehistoric bat genera
Fossil taxa described in 1981